Oshkosh is a city in Garden County, Nebraska, United States. The population was 884 at the 2010 census. It is the county seat of Garden County.

History
Oshkosh was founded in the 1880s by cattlemen who found the surrounding area ideal for livestock grazing. It was named after the city of Oshkosh, Wisconsin. The first post office in Oshkosh was established in 1889.

The railroad was extended to Oshkosh in 1908, and Oshkosh was designated county seat in 1909 of the new Garden County.

Oshkosh was incorporated in 1910.

On April 26th, 1938, an estimated F5 tornado struck near the city, disintegrating a school, killing 3 children, the tornado also destroyed two farms.

Geography
Oshkosh is located at  (41.408570, -102.346391), just north of the North Platte River.

Demographics

2010 census
As of the census of 2010, there were 884 people, 400 households, and 229 families residing in the city. The racial makeup of the city was 97.1% White, 0.1% African American, 0.3% Native American, 0.7% from other races, and 1.8% from two or more races. Hispanic or Latino of any race were 4.2% of the population.

There were 400 households, of which 25.0% had children under the age of 18 living with them, 45.0% were married couples living together, 8.3% had a female householder with no husband present, 4.0% had a male householder with no wife present, and 42.8% were non-families. 39.0% of all households were made up of individuals, and 22% had someone living alone who was 65 years of age or older. The average household size was 2.13 and the average family size was 2.82.

The median age in the city was 47.5 years. 21.9% of residents were under the age of 18; 5.8% were between the ages of 18 and 24; 19.7% were from 25 to 44; 25.4% were from 45 to 64; and 27.4% were 65 years of age or older. The gender makeup of the city was 48.4% male and 51.6% female.

2000 census
As of the census of 2000, there were 887 people, 413 households, and 249 families residing in the city. The population density was 1,316.8 people per square mile (511.2/km). There were 489 housing units at an average density of 726.0 per square mile (281.8/km). The racial makeup of the city was 99.44% White, 0.11% Native American, 0.11% Asian, and 0.34% from two or more races. Hispanic or Latino of any race were 1.92% of the population.

There were 413 households, out of which 23.2% had children under the age of 18 living with them, 49.2% were married couples living together, 7.5% had a female householder with no husband present, and 39.7% were non-families. 37.3% of all households were made up of individuals, and 19.6% had someone living alone who was 65 years of age or older. The average household size was 2.07 and the average family size was 2.72.

In the city, the population was spread out, with 20.6% under the age of 18, 4.5% from 18 to 24, 21.8% from 25 to 44, 23.6% from 45 to 64, and 29.5% who were 65 years of age or older. The median age was 47 years. For every 100 females, there were 84.8 males. For every 100 females age 18 and over, there were 81.0 males.

As of 2000 the median income for a household in the city was $27,135, and the median income for a family was $33,750. Males had a median income of $22,303 versus $18,000 for females. The per capita income for the city was $16,292. About 9.5% of families and 11.7% of the population were below the poverty line, including 17.9% of those under age 18 and 5.3% of those age 65 or over.

Climate 

References

External links
 
 City of Oshkosh Nebraska
 City-Data.com
 ePodunk: Profile for Oshkosh Nebraska

Cities in Nebraska
Cities in Garden County, Nebraska
County seats in Nebraska
Populated places established in 1910
1910 establishments in Nebraska